Ernest James Bailes IV (born April 13, 1982), is a Republican member of the Texas House of Representatives for District 18 in southeastern Texas. Bailes in 2017 succeeded Republican John Otto, who did not seek re-election in 2016.

Background
Bailes, a rancher and agriculturist, grew up on his family's beef and dairy cattle operations in East Texas. Growing up in Shepherd, he is a graduate of Shepherd High School and earned his Bachelor of Science degree from Texas A&M University in 2004. Following his graduation, Bailes founded his own company called Repro Select, an "advanced reproductive services provider for cattle and white tail deer producers across the South-Central United States. Bailes is married to Courtney Bailes, a third grade teacher at Coldspring - Oakhurst CISD. The couple has two sons named Cinco and Rigby.

Current legislative committees 
Bailes serves as a member of the following committees: Economic and Small Business Development, Land and Resource Management, Rules and Resolutions, Small Business Subcommittee, and Coastal Barrier Systems.

Legislative history
Bailes voted to prohibit one-punch straight ticket voting and voted to establish standards for determining adjusted franchise tax rates.

Additionally, Bailes voted against the Schaefer Amendment of Senate Bill 8, which would have required women to carry fetuses with fatal fetal abnormalities to term. The amendment was tabled. SB8 related to certain prohibited abortions and the treatment and disposition of embryonic and fetal tissue remains, creating a civil cause of action and imposing a civil penalty, creating criminal offense. The law was struck down by a court challenge before taking effect.

2018 reelection
Bailes won reelection to a second term in the general election held on November 6, 2018. With 35,538 votes (75.5 percent), he defeated Democrat Fred Lemond, who polled 11,514 votes (24.5 percent).

References

External links
 Campaign website
 State legislative page
 Ernest Bailes at the Texas Tribune

1982 births
Living people
Republican Party members of the Texas House of Representatives
21st-century American politicians
Texas A&M University alumni
People from Shepherd, Texas
Businesspeople from Texas